Invisible Children is a 2006 American documentary film that depicts the human rights abuses by the Lord's Resistance Army in Uganda.

Synopsis
In the spring of 2003, Jason Russell, Bobby Bailey, and Laren Poole traveled to Africa to document the War in Darfur. Instead, they changed their focus to the conflict in northern Uganda, Africa's second longest-running conflict after the Eritrean War of Independence. The documentary depicts the abduction of children who are used as child soldiers by Joseph Kony and his Lord's Resistance Army (LRA). This film centers around a group of Ugandan children who walk miles every night to places of refuge in order to avoid abduction by the LRA.

Exhibition
The film was first screened on June 22, 2004, at the Joan B. Kroc Institute for Peace and Justice at the University of San Diego.

Since then, Invisible Children, Inc. has hosted more than 10,000 screenings at colleges, high schools, churches, concerts and other venues. As of June 2009, it is estimated that more than 5 million people have seen Invisible Children: The Rough Cut.

Social activism
The story of children depicted in the film was the basis for a grassroots movement mobilizing thousands of American teens into action to raise money to rebuild war-torn schools in northern Uganda and provide scholarships to African youth.

In 2005, a 501(c)(3) non-profit, Invisible Children, Inc., was created, giving individuals a way to respond to the situation in Uganda. An employee of the organization, Nate Henn, was killed in the July 2010 Kampala attacks.

DVD
The film is roughly 55 minutes long, and the DVD includes a shorter 35-minute version for different screening options. The DVD also includes special features; deleted scenes, extras, filmmaker commentary, update on the war, and trailers from Invisible Children, Inc.

References

External links

 Joseph Kony 2012: growing outrage in Uganda over film
 Invisible Children Homepage
 
 Invisible Children images from film
 Mourning Nate Henn the Nate Henn memorial website
 Kony 2012 Kony 2012 Homepage

 
2006 films
2006 documentary films
American documentary films
Documentary films about Uganda
Films set in 2003
Documentary films about child soldiers
2000s English-language films
2000s American films